Hellinsia socorroica is a moth of the family Pterophoridae. It is found in Mexico (Socorro Island).

The wingspan is 19‑22 mm. The forewings are ferruginous‑brown. The hindwings are brown‑grey and the fringes are brown‑grey. Adults are on wing in June and September.

References

socorroica
Moths of Central America
Natural history of Colima
Moths described in 1991